Raimundo Nina Rodrigues (December 4, 1862 - July 17, 1906) was a Brazilian coroner, psychiatrist, professor, writer, anthropologist and ethnologist. A notable eugenicist, he was also a dietologist, tropicalist, sexologist, hygienist, biographer and epidemiologist.

Nina Rodrigues is considered the founder of Brazilian criminal anthropology and a pioneer in studies on black culture in the country. A nationalist, he was the first Brazilian scholar to address the theme of black people as a relevant social issue for understanding the racial formation of the Brazilian population, despite adopting a racist, deterministic perspective, in his book Os Africanos no Brasil (1890-1905).

Selected works 

 Regime alimentar no Norte do Brasil (1881)
 A Morféia em Andajatuba (1886)
 Das amiotrofias de origem periférica (Doctorate thesis, 1888)
 As raças humanas e a responsabilidade penal no Brasil (1894)
 O animismo fetichista dos negros baianos (1900)
 O alienado no Direito Civil Brasileiro (1901)
 Manual de autópsia médico-legal (1901)
 Os Africanos no Brasil (1932)
 As Coletividades anormais (1939)

References

Brazilian sociologists
Brazilian psychiatrists
1906 deaths
Brazilian eugenicists
Brazilian criminologists
Brazilian anthropologists
1862 births